Atelopus galactogaster, the Antado stubfoot toad, is a species of toad in the family Bufonidae endemic to Colombia within the northwestern Andean montane forests. The species' natural habitat is subtropical or tropical moist montane forests.

References

galactogaster
Amphibians of Colombia
Amphibians described in 1993
Taxonomy articles created by Polbot